Amr F. Zedan (born 17 September 1974) is a Saudi Arabian businessman, a serial venture capital investor, thoroughbred horse breeder, and the Chairman of the Saudi Polo Federation.

Education 
Zedan obtained a Bachelor of Science degree in industrial engineering management with a minor in electrical/digital engineering from the University of the Pacific, Stockton, California. Previously, he attended Texas A&M University, College Station, Texas.

Career 

He is Chairman of the Saudi Polo Federation. and a member of the board of directors of the Saudi Supreme Equestrian Authority.

He is also Chairman of family business the Zedan Group, a Saudi engineering conglomerate headquartered in Khobar.

He is also Chairman of ZedanMorgan Capital a top tier venture investments in Bio-Tech and Pharma based in New York.

His Zedan Racing Stables owned Medina Spirit, who crossed the finish line first in the 2021 Kentucky Derby.  However, the horse tested positive for  betamethasone after the race (and in a split sample test), which is prohibited at any level on race day.  The Kentucky Horse Racing Commission made the final decision to disqualify the horse on February 21, 2022.  Medina Spirit died on December 06, 2021 during a workout at Santa Anita of an apparent heart attack. A necropsy examining the sudden death was inconclusive.  Medina Spirit's ashes are interred at Old Friends's Nikki Bacharach Memorial Garden in Georgetown, Kentucky.   Medina Spirit was named for Zedan's home city of Medina.  Also he is an avid polo player, and Patron of Zedan Polo team.

In March 2022, Amr F. Zedan's net-worth was estimated at $1.2 billion.

Personal life
Zedan was born in Los Angeles, California. He is married to HRH Princess Noor bint Asem of Jordan.

References

Horse breeders
1974 births
Saudi Arabian businesspeople
Living people